The Saitta House is a two-and-a-half-story, single-family Queen Anne dwelling in the Dyker Heights section of Brooklyn, New York, United States.

It was completed ca. 1899 by architect John J. Petit and builder P.J. la Note for Beatrice and Simone Saitta (pronounced: sigh-eat-a). The home is located on the north side of 84th Street between Twelfth Avenue to the east and Eleventh Avenue to the west.

The Saitta House is significant in the area of architecture as a remarkably intact, high-style example of Queen Anne residential architecture, and for its association with the planning and development of Dyker Heights, a turn-of-the-20th-century suburban development in Brooklyn. No other house in Dyker Heights retains so much of its original architectural and structural components – both interior and exterior – as the Saitta House. The house was architect-designed for an affluent Dyker Heights family, and built ca. 1899 by craftsmen who came from Italy and lived on the premises during construction. Architect John J. Petit's work can be found elsewhere in Brooklyn, especially in the Prospect Park South Historic District (which is listed on National Register of Historic Places). The Saitta House was listed on both the State and National Register of Historic Places in 2007.

Gallery

References

Houses on the National Register of Historic Places in Brooklyn
Houses completed in 1899